Sunday is a Canadian animated short film by Patrick Doyon. The film debuted at the Berlin International Film Festival in February 2011 and online on January 5, 2012.

Dimanche is the first professional film by Doyon, a native of Montreal. Doyon had previously created a three-minute animated short Square Roots in 2006, while enrolled in the NFB's Hothouse program for young animators.

Still learning how to use computer animation tools, he worked with pen and pencil to create Dimanche, hand drawing the entire film. The 10-minute film took him two years to complete, creating individual drawings on paper, working on a light table. Doyon ended up with 15 boxes full of sheets with sketches, which he then scanned into the computer, colourized and began editing. Doyon believes such traditional animation techniques are better for portraying emotion.

Awards
The film was nominated Best Animated Short Film at the 84th Academy Awards as well as Best Animated Short Subject at the 39th Annie Awards. It also received the ASIFA-Colorado Award for the Best Animated Short at the 34th Denver Film Festival. It also received Quebec’s Prix Jutra for best animated short.

Plot 
Dimanche tells the story of a young boy who goes to his grandparents' house in a small town in Quebec after church on Sunday. Bored with the adult world, he wanders outside to indulge his hobby of creating elongated coins by placing them on train tracks. Doyon has said that the film is inspired by his youth in Desbiens, Quebec.

References

External links 
 Watch Dimanche on the NFB website 
 
 

2011 films
Canadian animated short films
National Film Board of Canada animated short films
Quebec films
Films set in Quebec
2010s animated short films
2011 animated films
Animated films without speech
2010s Canadian films
Best Animated Short Film Jutra and Iris Award winners